Howard Kevin Tarpey (born 30 March 1958) is a former Australian rules footballer who played with South Melbourne in the Victorian Football League (VFL).

He is the older brother of former Collingwood player Andrew Tarpey.

Notes

External links 

Living people
1958 births
Australian rules footballers from Queensland
Sydney Swans players
Morningside Australian Football Club players